Robert Ponsonby Tottenham (5 September 1773 – 28 April 1850; Robert Ponsonby Loftus until 1806) was an Irish Anglican Bishop in the first half of the 19th century.

He was born the younger son of Charles Loftus, 1st Marquess of Ely and Jane Myhill, daughter of Robert Myhill of Killarney, in Woodstock, County Wicklow on 5 September 1773  and educated at Christ Church, Oxford.  He was Precentor of Cashel from 1798 until 1804 when he was elevated to the episcopate as Bishop of Killaloe and Kilfenora. Upon his father's death, he inherited the family's Tottenham Green  estate, changing his surname back to the older family name of Tottenham. In 1820 he was translated to Ferns and two years later to Clogher, where he replaced the disgraced Bishop Jocelyn. He died in post on 28 April 1850.

He married the Hon. Alicia  Maude, daughter of Cornwallis Maude, 1st Viscount Hawarden  and his third wife Anne Monck, and had numerous children of whom seven reached adult life, including the youngest, George Tottenham, Dean of Clogher 1900-03.

There is a memorial tablet to him in Clogher Cathedral.

References

 

1773 births
1850 deaths
People from County Wicklow
Alumni of Christ Church, Oxford
19th-century Anglican bishops in Ireland
Bishops of Killaloe and Kilfenora
Bishops of Ferns and Leighlin
Bishops of Clogher (Church of Ireland)
Younger sons of marquesses